Kim Bullard is an American keyboardist, songwriter, record producer, and film composer. He has been making music since the 1970s and has performed extensively as a keyboard player with musical acts such as Elton John and Crosby, Stills, & Nash.

As a recording studio session player he has played piano, keyboards, and synthesizer with recording artists Yes, Santana, Kenny Loggins, Heart, Belinda Carlisle, The Doobie Brothers, Tori Amos, Kelly Clarkson, and Carrie Underwood among numerous others.

Bullard was a longstanding band member of the band Poco, and is currently a member of the Elton John Band.

Early life
Bullard was born and raised in Atlanta, Georgia, where he began playing piano at five years old. He attributes much of his success as a pianist to his mother's support, and his desire to learn playing piano.

Music career

Crosby, Stills, & Nash (1977-1979) 
Bullard moved to Los Angeles, California in 1973 and began performing with various musicians which led to being hired by French recording artist, Veronique Sanson as her keyboard player and music director. Bullard had formed a band in Los Angeles which he brought with him to France to perform and record with Veronique Sanson. He lived in France from 1975 to 1976 during which time he met Veronique's husband, Stephen Stills of Crosby, Stills, & Nash who would later offer Kim a touring position with Crosby, Stills, & Nash in 1977 as a keyboard player, which he accepted. Kim toured with CSN from 1977 to 1979.

Poco (1978–1983) 
Bullard joined Poco in December 1978 just as Legend was being released, performing keyboards and backing vocals with the group.

During the first half of the 1980s, the group released five more albums which Bullard played keyboards and sang on, these albums were, Under the Gun (1980), Blue And Gray (1981), Cowboys & Englishmen (1982), Ghost Town (1982) and Inamorata (1984). Bullard toured extensively with the band from 1978 to 1983.  Poco's album, Cowboys & Englishmen was nominated for a Grammy Award in 1983.

Bullard left Poco to rejoin Crosby, Stills & Nash in 1983.

Katy Rose (2004) 
Bullard began working with his daughter, Katy Rose on vocals and songwriting in the studio was she was just twelve years old.  By the time Rose was sixteen years old, he produced her album, Because I Can for V2 Records, which was released on January 27, 2004, along with "Overdrive", her first single from the album. "Overdrive" also appears on the Mean Girls soundtrack. "Lemon" is featured on the Thirteen soundtrack. Both songs are featured on Because I Can.

Elton John (2009–present) 
Through Bullard's session work in Los Angeles, he recorded and toured with people within the Elton John music community. When keyboard player, Guy Babylon died, Bullard was asked to become the keyboardist for the Elton John Band. Kim's first performance as a member of the Elton John Band took place on October 7, 2009, in Moscow.

Discography

References

External links
Kim Bullard | Credits
Kim Bullard

1955 births
20th-century American pianists
21st-century American pianists
American organists
20th-century American keyboardists
21st-century American keyboardists
Record producers from Georgia (U.S. state)
American film score composers
American male film score composers
American male songwriters
American male pianists
Songwriters from Georgia (U.S. state)
21st-century American male musicians
Living people
20th-century American male musicians
Poco members
Elton John Band members